Death in the Desert Is a 2017 American love-drama film directed and produced by Josh Evans and starring Michael Madsen and Shayla Beesley, with John Palladino, Paz de la Huert and Roxy Saint appearing in supporting roles. Principal filming completed in February 2014 in Las Vegas, Nevada. It is the second film collaboration between Madsen and Evans, who produced The Price of Air in which Madsen starred.

Released in March 2016 by Osiris Entertainment, the film is based on the book Death in the Desert by true-crime author Cathy Scott about Ted Binion, a wealthy gambling executive and one of the sons of famed Las Vegas casino magnate Lester Ben "Benny" Binion, owner of Binion's Horseshoe. The book adaptation was written by screenwriter John Steppling.

The storyline covers the real-life 1998 death of the younger Binion, a drug addict who had lost his Nevada gaming license, and his live-in girlfriend Sandra Murphy, charged with murdering Binion along with her lover Rick Tabish, who was caught digging up Binion's buried silver.

Reception 

The film first premiered in October 2015 at the Tucson Festival of Films.

Indiewire wrote, "Luckily for Madsen fans, the actor looks to be having a complete blast in his most recent film, Death in the Desert.

Vegas Seven Magazine, in its review, wrote, "Death in the Desert, despite its protagonist’s wealth, rides the downbeat vibe of a back-alley, underbelly Vegas. What emerges is a muted, thoughtful study of disillusionment, dashed dreams and fatal appetites via a relationship that takes root amid the mechanical sensuality of a Downtown strip joint."

Movies Review 101 described the film as "already labelled a 'classic' by The Huffington Post, who applauded the film’s 'captivating' cast of characters and 'dark and addictive' story" which is "expected to win Michael Madsen some of the best notices of his career."

Cast 

 Michael Madsen as Ray Easler
 Shayla Beesley as Kim Davis
 John Palladino as Matt Duvall
 Paz de la Huerta as Margo
 Roxy Saint	 as Cory
Julian Brand as Nicky Ramone
 Eduard Osipov as Pete
 Kent Christian as Faque Brown
 Timothy Skyler Dunigan as Rocky
 Kerry Fezza as Nurse
 Richard Hotson	as Mac Curry
 Mark Justice as Rudy
 Allison Lear as Christy
 Stephen Manley as Cicero
 Alfonzo McCarther as Merced
 Joe Palubinsky as Garza
 Gary Sax as Wesley
 Brian H. Scott	as David Mattsen

References

External links 

 
 

2015 films
2015 crime drama films
American crime drama films
Drama films based on actual events
Films based on non-fiction books
Films set in the Las Vegas Valley
2015 biographical drama films
Films shot in Nevada
Crime films based on actual events
American biographical drama films
2010s English-language films
2010s American films